John Tredeneck (by 1508 – 1566), of Tredinnick in St. Breock, Cornwall, was an English politician.

He was a Member of Parliament (MP) for Lostwithiel in 1529 and for Helston in 1559.

References

1566 deaths
People from Dover, Kent
Members of the Parliament of England for Lostwithiel
Year of birth uncertain
English MPs 1559
Members of the Parliament of England for Helston